Thomas Barrows III (born November 2, 1987) is a sailor who lives in the United States Virgin Islands and attended Yale University, where he won the ICSA Men's Singlehanded National Championship in 2008 and earned the ICSA College Sailor of the Year Award in 2010.

He competed on behalf of the Virgin Islands at the 2008 Beijing Olympics, where he participated in the one-person Laser-class dinghy event.

References

External links
 
 
 

1987 births
Living people
American male sailors (sport)
United States Virgin Islands male sailors (sport)
Olympic sailors of the United States
Olympic sailors of the United States Virgin Islands
Sailors at the 2008 Summer Olympics – Laser
Sailors at the 2016 Summer Olympics – 49er
Yale Bulldogs sailors
ICSA College Sailor of the Year